Mount Burton is a graywacke peak,  high, standing at the west side of the mouth of Osuga Glacier in the Barker Range, Victory Mountains, Victoria Land. It was named by the New Zealand Federated Mountain Clubs Antarctic Expedition (NZFMCAE), 1962–63, after William Burton, crew member on the Terra Nova during the British Antarctic Expedition, 1910–13. Burton, who lived in New Zealand, was a guest of the U.S. Navy during the 1962–63 Antarctic season when he visited the continent again with two others of Scott's veterans.

The nearest peaks are Mount McDonald, Mount Hancox, Braddock Peak, Kyle Peak, Mount Jennings, and Mount Roy.

References
 

Mountains of Victoria Land
Borchgrevink Coast